Fterikoudi is a village in the Nicosia District of Cyprus, located 4 km north of Palaichori Morphou.

Fterikoudi is built on the green slope of Troodos, approximately 48 km southwest of the capital city. It is one of the beautiful and picturesque villages of the region of Pitsilia and at the same time one of the 20 highest villages of Cyprus as it is built on an altitude of 1050 metres.

Historical background

Fterikoudi was established shortly after 1570, when the neighbouring community of Kalamithasa was destroyed and which is referred to by De Mas Latri as one of the royal estates of the Lusignan and Venetian period. In particular, according to tradition Fterikoudi was established by the residents of Kalamithasa who survived the catastrophic rage of the Turks. Today, the chapel and grave of Saint and Prophet Avvacum are located in the area where Kalamithasa used to be built.

What is noteworthy is that recent excavations at the village have brought to light an ancient temple and a tomb entrance which are probably dated back to the Mycenaean period.

Naming

The sword fern plant or “fteritzin”, “fterikoudin” or “fterikia” as it is also known gave its name to the village. The sword fern is a plant which grows in abundance in Fterikoudi and this is evident while strolling around the village.

However, there are some who believe that the name of the village is linked to its location. In particular, they support that the naming of the village derives from the fact that it is built on a slope (fteri).

Population

Fterikoudi is one of the small in population villages of the Nicosia District. Over the past few years the population of the village has decreased enormously. The main reason for the abandonment of the village is employment in the capital city. Commuting to work on a daily basis is unbearable and this urges all the more people to move to the capital permanently, while it is worth mentioning that after the Turkish invasion tens of workers commuted to Nicosia. After studying the following table one notices several fluctuations in the number of residents starting from 1881 until today.

Churches

Church of Agios Nicolaos

The main church of the Community is dedicated to Agios Nicolaos and is located in the residential core of the village.

The church of Agios Nicolaos was constructed in 1818 and inaugurated in 1853, while renovation works at the church took place in 1992. In particular, the renovation works included the replacement of the roof and its external supports. Additionally, its old tiles were used to repair the northern side of the roof, while for the southern side new tiles that were transferred from Agios Theodoros Soleas were used. What is also worth mentioning is that the tiles of the church of Agios Nicolaos are identical to the ones of the church of Timios Stavros Agiasmati.  

The church is approximately 22 metres long and 6 metres wide. The chancel of the church was created in 1910 by Stylianos Papapetrou, during which time the church committee consisted of members K. Hadjiyiannis and X. Papademetriou. The Crucifixion and the “Lypitera” located on the upper part of the chancel are golden, exactly as the older chancel of the church was and which is not salvaged today. Actually, there is information that this chancel is displayed in a Museum in the USA.  

Source: Father Andreas Poumpouris

Chapel of Saint and Prophet Avvacum

The chapel of miracle-maker Saint and Prophet Avvacum is located on the western edge of the community. A village named Kalamithasa used to be built there. However, that village was destroyed in 1575 by the Turks and its residents were forced to abandon it and move to the area where Fterikoudi is located today.

The chapel of Saint Avvacum was built in 1989 by father Andreas Poumpouris and many other benefactors who contributed both large and small amounts of money. In particular, important financial contributions were made by the following benefactors: Alexandros and Dorothy Elissaiou (£35000), Savvas Papanikola from Platanistasa (£9000), Andreas Odysseos (£5000) and Sophia Hadjiyianni Kayia (£5000).  In the same year and more specifically on July 15, 1989, the location where the Saint lived his ascetic life, his grave and his relics was found. What pilgrims need to know is that access to the Saint's grave is easy and that it is open on a daily basis. The architecture of the church of Saint Avvacum is similar to the one of Timios Stavros Agiasmati. Beneath the present church are the ruins of the old church of the Saint which was destroyed in 1575 by the Turks.   Learn more about the life and miracles of the Saint by clicking on the link “Saint Avvacum”.

Source: Father Andreas Poumpouris

Chapel of Panagia Chrysogalousa (Galaktotrofousa)

In Fterikoudi there is a small chapel dedicated to Panagia Chrysogalousa (Galaktotrofousa). This is located approximately 1 km west of the community, at the location “Vartaklis” of Pano Moni, that is between the community and the chapel of Saint Avvacum.

The Chapel of Panagia was constructed in 1998 and its architecture is similar to the one of the church of Timios Stavros Agiasmati. At the place where the church of Panagia stands today there used to be an older church which was however destroyed in 1575 by the Turks, while it is worth noting that the older church was also dedicated to Panagia Chrysogalousa so that she would help mothers breastfeed more.

The ancient icon of Panagia is located at the holy church of Agios Georgios in Alona. The reasons of the transfer of the icon to Alona remain unknown.

Ruins of the church of Agios Efstathios At the community there are ruins of the church of Agios Efstathios, protector saint of hunters. The restoration of the church is being planned.

Source: Father Andreas Poumpouris

References

External links
http://www.fterikoudi.com/en/history-len.html

Communities in Nicosia District